The Fourth Texas Legislature met from November 3, 1851 to February 7, 1853 in its regular session and one called session. All members of the House of Representatives and about half of the members of the Senate were elected in 1850.

Sessions
 4th Regular session: November 3, 1851 – February 16, 1852
 4th First called session: January 10–February 7, 1853

Party summary

Officers

Senate
 Lieutenant Governor James Wilson Henderson, Democrat
 President pro tempore Edward Burleson, Democrat, Regular session
 Jesse Grimes, Democrat, Regular session, First called session

  Senator Burleson died during the regular session on December 26, 1851.

House of Representatives
 Speaker of the House  David Catchings Dickson, Democrat

Add to Representatives: Issac B. McFarland, Democrat, elected in 1851 from La Grange, Fayette County

Sources: several obituaries, family history, list of One Hundredth Anniversary of the District Courts of  Travis County, Texas

Members

Senate
Members of the Texas Senate for the Fourth Texas Legislature:

House of Representatives
Members of the House of Representatives for the Fourth Texas Legislature:

 Hamilton P. Bee
 Guy Morrison Bryan
 David Catchings Dickson
 Randolph C. Doom
 Memucan Hunt, Jr.
 William G. W. Jowers
 William H. Johnson
 Evans Mabry
 Robert Simpson Neighbors
 John Patrick
 Robert Peebles
 Emory Rains
 James Rowe
 Hardin Richard Runnels
 Charles Bellinger Tate Stewart
 Benjamin E. Tarver
 Robert H. Taylor
 Andrew Jackson Titus
 Amasa Turner

Membership Changes

Senate

External links

04 Texas Legislature
1850s in Texas
1851 establishments in Texas
1851 in Texas
1852 in Texas
1851 U.S. legislative sessions
1852 U.S. legislative sessions